In Old Florida is an American silent film produced by Kalem Company and directed by Sidney Olcott with Gene Gauntier in the leading role.

Cast
 Gene Gauntier –

Production notes
The film was shot in Jacksonville, Florida.

External links

 In Old Florida website dedicated to Sidney Olcott

1910 films
Silent American drama films
American silent short films
Films set in Florida
Films shot in Jacksonville, Florida
Films directed by Sidney Olcott
1910 short films
1910 drama films
American black-and-white films
1911 drama films
1911 films
1910s American films